{{Taxobox
| name = Hydrogenophaga flava
| domain = Bacteria
| phylum = Pseudomonadota
| classis = Betaproteobacteria
| ordo = Burkholderiales
| familia = Comamonadaceae
| genus = Hydrogenophaga| binomial = Hydrogenophaga flava| binomial_authority = (Niklewski 1910)  Willems et al. 1989
| type_strain =
ATCC 33667 
CCUG 1658 
CCUG 22894 
CFBP 2438 
CIP 103271 
DSM 619 
JCM 21413 
LMG 2185
| synonyms = Pseudomonas flava (Niklewski 1910) Davis 1969  Hydrogenomonas flava Niklewski 1910
}}Hydrogenophaga flava'' is a species of Gram-negative, rod-shaped comamonad bacteria.

External links
Type strain of Hydrogenophaga flava at BacDive -  the Bacterial Diversity Metadatabase

Comamonadaceae
Bacteria described in 1910